Crematogaster aroensis is a species of ant in tribe Crematogastrini. It was described by Menozzi in 1935.

References

aroensis
Insects described in 1935